Ildefonsus is a genus of lace bugs in the family Tingidae. There are about six described species in Ildefonsus.

Species
These six species belong to the genus Ildefonsus:
 Ildefonsus ampliatus Péricart, 1985
 Ildefonsus distanti Li and Zheng, 2006
 Ildefonsus javanus Péricart, 2000
 Ildefonsus nepalensis Tomokuni, 1981
 Ildefonsus nexus Drake and Ruhoff, 1961
 Ildefonsus provorsus Distant, 1910

References

Further reading

 
 
 
 
 
 
 
 
 
 
 

Tingidae
Articles created by Qbugbot